Merlijn Twaalfhoven (born February 14, 1976, Wapserveen) is a Dutch composer. He graduated from the Conservatorium van Amsterdam in 2003. Twaalfhoven is internationally active in creating innovative projects and writing new music for orchestras, choirs and chamber music groups. He collaborated with Toneelgroep Amsterdam, Holland Festival, Nederlands Philharmonisch Orkest, the Dutch National Ballet and Springdance festival, among many others. With his non profit organization La Vie Sur Terre he frequently produces large scale projects on location with local artists and musicians, for example in Cyprus, Japan, Jordan, the Palestinian Territories, Syria, and Central Europe. Twaalfhoven is a member of the  Alpbach Laxenburg Group. He was a speaker about the role of arts in conflict areas at Aspen Institute Washington and Aspen Ideas Festival in Aspen, CO. In 2014 and 2015, Merlijn Twaalfhoven created "Bridging The Divide", a conversation with Tomáš Sedláček and Gloria Benedikt, linking economics and the irrational, positioning artists as agents of change. He was co-founder of Citizen Artist Incubator together with Gloria Benedikt, which was funded by Creative Europe and brought together 30 artists in two editions. The 2016 of Citizen Artist Incubator took place at IIASA. Twaalfhoven was a speaker about the role of arts in conflict areas at Aspen Institute Washington, TEDx Amsterdam, the European Forum on Culture 2013, 2016  and Aspen Ideas Festival in Aspen, Colorado, U.S.A.  In 2017 he founded the Turn Club.

Artistic vision
For Twaalfhoven, musical expression revolves around communication: 'A work of art doesn't mean anything if the audience is not touched by it' He tends to take music out of its traditional surroundings, to mix it with other expressions of Western or non-Western culture. He also tends to get the musicians out of their usual behaviour patterns and so stimulate interactions with the audience. His projects often take place at alternative concert locations such as a shipyard in the Amsterdam harbor, an old warehouse, or a nature spot. Politics are part of a majority of his work. This can be seen by the areas of social tension he brings his works to (for example Cyprus or the Palestinian Territories). He often speaks and writes about his outspoken vision on art and its function in society. A few illustrations are: his speech during TEDx Amsterdam conference in 2009, his professorship at ArtEZ School of Arts (see Research), as well as his published articles and book (see Publications).

City composer
Twaalfhoven was the first 'citycomposer' in the Netherlands. He performed this task for the municipality of Zaanstad where he was appointed for one year on September 25, 2006. Local musicians, professionals, actors, visual artists and volunteers played leading roles at all performances. The post of citycomposer is not unique to the Netherlands. For instance Ghent in Belgium had a citycomposer appointed for the first time in 2004. Twaalfhoven's work in Zaanstad culminated in a large main event: 'Droomzomernacht', an adaptation of Shakespeare's A Midsummer Night's Dream, performed with over 150 local musicians, dancers and actors
In October 2010 he has been appointed for the task of citycomposer again, this time in the municipality of Haarlemmermeer.

Selected projects
 The Music on Troubled Soils Conference (Jerusalem, 2008). Merlijn was a speaker at this conference, which discussed the role of music in troubled regions such as Israel, Cyprus and South Africa.
Al Quds Underground (2009/2010) Festival in East Jerusalem. Western and Palestinian musicians and actors collaborate in about 150 small performances in living rooms.
 La Nuit n'est pas un chocolat (2002–2006) Yearly spectacle combining contemporary music, theater, cookery and dance. (Performance location: Paradiso, Amsterdam 2002–2006)
 Long Distance Call (2005) A project in Cyprus with musicians from both sides of the border. They performed on rooftops to bridge the buffer zone that is dividing the island into a Greek and a Turkish part.
 Symphony for All (2006) Performed by professional and amateur musicians together with school children 
 Torenhoog Mijlenbreed (2009) Large scale composition for modern carillon (named 'de Zingende Toren', designed by artist Bernard Heesen) and about 500 school children and 9 professional singers, performed at the opening of 'Cultuurcampus Vleuterweide'.
 Holland Festival (2016). 276 bassoon players gathered in the Royal Concertgebouw in an attempt to raise the popularity of this instrument, composed by Merlijn Twaalfhoven.
 Four Drifting Seasons (2017) – world premiere by composer Merlijn Twaalfhoven at the Concert for a Sustainable Planet at Carnegie Hall, NYC. This concert was organized by the  United Nations Sustainable Development Solutions Network (SDSN) and the International Institute of Applied Systems Analysis (IIASA).
 Musical Postcards: Merlijn Twaalfhoven is a member of the Musical Postcards Team.

Discography
1 Gram Of Time 2005 (CD by Amstel Quartet for which Twaalfhoven composed the title song) Amstel Records AR 004.
Off Limits  2006 (Cd by Susanna Borsch on which she plays 'Winter in/m April' by Twaalfhoven. Karnatic Lab Records ASIN B000SKKD1I.
Dusting For Prints 2009 (CD by Esquire Saxofoon Kwartet on which they play Majority Deviation (2004) by Twaalfhoven). Bonte Koe Records (BKR 014).

Research
From 2004 to 2008 Twaalfhoven was a professor in 'PopKunst' at ArtEZ Institute of the Arts in the Netherlands. He performed research on how artists could reach a new and diverse audience without compromising their artistic vision and ideas. During his studies at the Conservatorium van Amsterdam he performed artistic research on Japanese aesthetics.

Publications
Column in Kaap Kunst art magazine, no.7, pag.35 [2010]. Utrecht: Kunstfactor.
Article in Jaarboek Actieve Cultuurparticipatie, pag.85–87 [2010]. Utrecht: Fonds voor Cultuurparticipatie. 
Book: Art In Society – Twaalfhoven, Merlijn [2009]. Zwolle: De Jonge Hond.  
On Peace – column for Treaty of Utrecht [2009].
Article in journal Boekman 72: Art and Audience, pag.40–45 [2007]. Amsterdam: Boekmanstichting.
Necessity of Desintegration in Kennist Loont 2007–2011, pag.40–43 [2007]. Utrecht: Dutch University Press. 
Articles in Trans Artists magazine [2005]. Amsterdam: TransArtists.
Article in journal Boekman 62: Art and Money, pag.74–75 [2005]. Amsterdam: Boekmanstichting.
Article in daily newspaper Trouw [2004]. Amsterdam: De Persgroep Nederland.
De Veelte – website on Japanese Aesthetics [2003].
Merlijn Twaalfhoven wrote blogs for Citizen Artist Incubator.

Awards and recognitions
Audience Award and Jury Award during the :nl:Nederlandse Muziekdagen 2003
Honourable mention young composers at the International Rostrum of Composers 2003 for 'If you reveal...'
2nd prize at the KBC Aquarius composition contest 2002 for 'If you reveal...'
2nd prize at the Jur Naessens Muziekprijs competition 2002
NOG Stimuleringsprijs (encouragement prize), awarded by Nederlands Ballet Orkest (Dutch ballet orchestra) in 2000 for GUSH.
 Amsterdamprijs voor de kunst – nominee (2015)
 Torch bearer award (2016)
 Gieskes Strijbis Podiumprijs – nominee (2017)

See also
2009 Arab Capital of Culture
List of Dutch composers

References

External links
Official website of Merlijn Twaalfhoven
Foundation: laviesurterre.nl
Projects in the Middle East: arabica.nu
Vision behind professorship: popkunst.nl
www.adamsebire.info Cameraman, editor, director. (Made documentary of project 'Echoes across the Divide')
Biography
Symphony For All in the Netherlands: Videolink
Symphony For All in Jordan: Videolink

1976 births
Living people
21st-century classical composers
21st-century male musicians
Composers for carillon
Conservatorium van Amsterdam alumni
Dutch classical composers
Dutch male classical composers
People from Westerveld